Ekai may refer to:

Ekai language, a language of Myanmar
Ekai Kawaguchi, Japanese monk
, a settlement in Longida, Spain
, a settlement in Arakil, Spain

See also 
ECAI (disambiguation)